Fantasy Strike is a free-to-play fighting video game developed and published by Sirlin Games. It revolves around one-on-one battles that require fast reflexes. The game was released on July 25, 2019 for Linux, macOS, Microsoft Windows, Nintendo Switch, PlayStation 4.

Gameplay 
Fantasy Strike is designed to be less complex than traditional fighting games, having dedicated buttons for every action, including melee, jump/throw, special moves, and a super move. Each player picks a character to play, which are then placed in an arena. By performing various attacks unique to the character, each player tries to bring down their opponents health pool down to zero to win a round. Whoever is the first to win four out of seven rounds is given the match win. In addition to attacks, players can use blocking to defend against attacks and break through blocks by using throws. A unique feature to Fantasy Strike is the "Yomi Counter", which can be performed when not attacking by pressing no buttons at all. When yomi countering, if the character is hit by an opponents throw, they won't get hit and instead perform a counter throw, turning the tables.

The game features various modes. Single-player pits the player in matches against AI controlled opponents, with different modes putting a different spin on the formula. Arcade adds some story through artwork and dialog, as well as stronger version of the character Midori who serves as the final challenge, Survival provides a stream of progressively stronger opponents. Daily Challenge is similar to Survival, but can only be played once per day and compares the score between the players. Single Match allows a selection of any opponent and difficulty for a standard match. Boss Rush, which was added afterwards for the full release, allows the player to pick up and use power-ups, but introduces special opponents that also possess power-ups and get stronger after each battle.

Multiplayer allows player-against-player matches both locally and online. The latter provides automatic match-making for a casual and a ranked queue, or directly challenging specific opponents through friend matches. Players may either choose to play Standard or Team Battle. Standard refers to the classic mode, where each player picks a character to play a best of seven. Team Battle instead makes each player pick three characters. The game will then randomly pick a character from each players pool of characters, upon which the players play a best of five. The winning player removes his character from his pool. This is repeated until a player has no more characters in his pool, meaning he won with all of his characters and is thus declared the winner. Team Battle is used in ranked play and proposed as the go-to mode for tournaments, as it is designed to alleviate the issue of counter-picking.

In addition to single-player and multi-player modes, there is also a tutorial, a learn section and a training mode. The tutorial teaches new players how to play the game in general, while the learn section contains characters spotlight videos that delve deeper into what to do with each individual character. Training mode lets the player experiment and practice with a character as well as look up frame data in real-time.

Plot 

The game is set in the world of the same name, "Fantasy Strike", a world featured in other games made by Sirlin Games. In the story, Rook hosts a martial arts tournament to rally the strongest fighters of the land.

Characters 
The game features twelve different playable characters, categorized into four different groups: zoner, rushdown, grappler and wildcard.

Zoners:  Great at overwhelming their opponent with multiple projectiles and specials.
 Grave (Ryu-style character)
 Jaina (a traditional zoner who uses Fire, inspired by Sagat from the Street Fighter series)
 Argagarg (Dhalsim and F.A.N.G-style character)
 Geiger (a remix of a charge character, having trouble getting in because of his charge meter, meaning he's nearly helpless when moving forward. Based on Guile from the Street Fighter series)
Rushdown: Ideal for getting in. Have many great combos, but usually have low health and damage.
 Valerie (a long range rushdown that is possibly inspired by Millia Rage)
 Setsuki (a close range ninja with myriad command grabs. Inspired by Ibuki from the Street Fighter series).
Grapplers: Grapplers have the same goal as rushdowns, but are slow, big, do more damage and have more health, thus surviving longer, but have trouble getting in. In Fantasy Strike, characters cannot be command grabbed if they are in the air. 
 Midori (stance character with dragon form. Has parry that gives him a command grab and helps him fill his meter, utilizing reads and proper spacing in order to excel. Probably inspired by Gen and E. Honda, both from the Street Fighter series)
 Rook (a stone golem with tools to get in and do damage; similar to other games' grapplers like Zangief, from Street Fighter)
Wild Card: These characters have gimmicks and manage to stay balanced, using certain themes for their character design and their moves. For example, Quince is a politician, so he uses illusions and tricks the opponent for his own advantage.
 Lum (an RNG trickster character who pressures the opponent. Inspired by Faust from the Guilty Gear series)
 Onimaru (a sword character who excels at block strings and uses large hitboxes in order to space his opponent)
 Quince (a politician who confuses the opponent with mix-ups, 50-50s, cross-ups, and special moves. Has great combo potential, but isn't quite a pushdown because of his lack of speed, true combos, and reliance on unpredictability)
 DeGrey (a character who catches the opponent's mistakes and frame traps them. He has special properties on counter hitting. He is unpredictable and uses set ups. Inspired by Slayer from the Guilty Gear series).

Reception

Fantasy Strike received "generally favorable reviews", according to website Metacritic.

Many reviewers praised the game's accessibility by virtue of the relative ease of execution, while retaining the depth that makes fighting games difficult to master and fun. Farrell from PC Invasion stated that "the game is purely skill-based, as every good fighter game is. There was some concern regarding its simplistic nature and limited movesets. With ten characters, some noted that Fantasy Strike's roster was relatively small.
By contrast, others noted how those few characters were highly distinct and offered unique experiences. The game's accessibility was also cited as a strength.

Martinez from Gaming Illustrated wrote, "Utilizing both videos and tutorials helps you deepen your understanding of surface and high level play and the underlying mechanics.". Furthermore, reviewers commented on how the clean visuals and various UI Hints (such as color-coded moves and "Jumpable" text) increased clarity in its visuals. Reviewers also agreed that its rollback based netcode made for a solid online experience.

Reviewers were divided on the game's visual style. PC Invasion, among other outlets, claimed, "The visuals and aesthetics are mostly bland", ascribing the game a typical style that is not distinct enough to set itself apart. On the other hand, some highlighted the game as something that is pleasing to look at.

Reviewers also expressed their dissatisfaction with some of the single-player modes.
Jones from Heavy said, "While there’s a lot of modes on display here, not all of them are fully featured and worth returning to." and O'Reilly from Nintendo Life complained that the "arcade mode is a little barebones". In contrast, the single player-mode boss rush was cited as a highlight.

References

External links 
Official website

2019 video games
Free-to-play video games
Nintendo Switch games
PlayStation 4 games
Fighting games
Video games developed in the United States
Video games with cross-platform play
Windows games